Judson Cornwall (15 August 1924 – 11 February 2005) was a prolific Charismatic Christian preacher, pastor, and author of over 50 books on varied subjects such as worship, praise, spiritual warfare, and death.

A third-generation minister, Judson Cornwall was preaching at the age of 7 during the Depression era, and later was regarded as an apostle and pioneer. After starting and pastoring churches in the West, Cornwall, a former Assemblies of God preacher, ministered worldwide for more than 20 years, preaching, teaching, and training ministers and laity of various denominations. Three of his books, Let Us Worship, Elements of Worship, and Let Us Praise, are widely considered Christian classics.

References

1924 births
2005 deaths
Assemblies of God people
American Christian clergy